The Dictionnaire de la langue française by Émile Littré, commonly called simply the "Littré", is a four-volume dictionary of the French language published in Paris by Hachette.

The dictionary was originally issued in 30 parts, 1863–72; a second edition is dated 1872–77.  A further edition is reported in 1877, published by Hachette.

An on-line version is available for PC, Mac and iOS (app for iPhone, iPad and iPod):  .

The British Library's on-line integrated catalogue describes the contents as: 1o Pour la nomenclature...: 2o Pour la grammaire...: 3o Pour la signification des mots...: 4o Pour la partie historique...: 5o Pour l’étymologie..

References

External links
  Online edition

1877 non-fiction books
Francaise Littre, Dictionnaire de la langue
Hachette (publisher) books